Bernard Launois (born 8 April 1930) is a French exploitation film director, screenwriter and actor. As an actor, he sometimes used the pseudonym Bob Gary.

He was born in Mézières, France. After studying pharmacology for two years in the university, he sought a career in the film industry instead. He worked as a trainee editor and then briefly as an assistant director. In 1953, he was employed by Paramount's programming department in Paris.

In 1979, he founded his own company, Lancaster Film, to finance the films he wrote and directed. He also edited film trailers and played minor roles as an actor. His debut film as director, Lâchez les chiennes (1972), was an improvised work that he wrote in three days. Devil Story, his seventh and last feature film, gained a cult following despite its reputation as one of the worst films in history.

He founded Delta Films and bought a four-theatre multiplex in 1987. He retired from the filmmaking business at the end of the 1980s.

Filmography

Director
 1972: Lâchez les chiennes
 1975: Les Dépravées du plaisir or Le Gibier
 1976: Les Machines à sous
 1976: La Grande Suédoise or Partouzes franco-suédoises
 1980: Sacrés gendarmes
 1980: Touch' pas à mon biniou or Gueules de vacances
 1985: Devil Story or Il était une fois... le diable

Producer
 1976: Les Machines à sous
 1980: Touch' pas à mon biniou or Gueules de vacances

Actor
 1970: Le Voyageur by 
 1971: Une Femme libre de Claude Pierson
 1971: Chaleurs or La femme créa l'amant by Daniel Daert
 1971: Caroline mannequin nu by Daniel Lesueur
 1971: Deux mâles pour Alexa (Fieras sin jaula) by Juan Logar
 1973: Pigalle carrefour des illusions by Pierre Chevalier
 1973:  by Christian Lara
1980: Touch' pas à mon biniou or Gueules de vacances
1985: Devil Story or Il était une fois... le diable

References

External links
 

Living people
1930 births
20th-century French screenwriters
Comedy film directors
French male film actors
French film directors
Horror film directors
People from Charleville-Mézières